The Mersin District 7 Sports Hall is a multi-sport indoor arena located at Toroslar district of Mersin Province, Turkey. Owned by the Mersin National Education Directoriate, the sports hall was leased free of charge to the Mersin Youth Services and Sports Directoriate for a time span of 49 years in 2005. The venue is suitable for use of basketball, boxing, martial arts, table tennis, volleyball and wrestling events, and has a seating capacity of 325.

The locker rooms of the venue were renovated in 2007. In 2012, the sports hall underwent a major renovation and modernization costing about 1 million for use during the 2013 Mediterranean Games. Table tennis training activities of the Games were held at the venue.

References

Indoor arenas in Turkey
Sports venues completed in 2005
Basketball venues in Turkey
Volleyball venues in Turkey
Sports venues in Mersin
2013 Mediterranean Games venues
Toroslar District